WUCR-LP (107.9 FM) is a radio station licensed to Lake Butler, Florida, United States.  The station is currently owned by Synewave Communications, Inc.

References

External links
 

UCR-LP
UCR-LP